Napoleon in Russia: Borodino 1812 is a video game written by Steve Krenek for the Atari 8-bit family and published by Krentek Software in 1987.

Gameplay
Napoleon in Russia: Borodino 1812 is a game in which the Battle of Borodino is simulated.

Reception
M. Evan Brooks reviewed the game for Computer Gaming World, and stated that "Borodino is a solid effort. While it does not forge a breakthrough in game development, it is easy to learn, valid historically and entertaining. For those desirous of learning about Napoleonic warfare, it is recommended."

Reviews
Computer Gaming World - Oct, 1990

References

External links
Review in Compute!
Review in Antic
Review in ANALOG Computing
Review in RUN Magazine

1987 video games
Atari 8-bit family games
Commodore 64 games
Computer wargames
Napoleonic Wars video games
Turn-based strategy video games
Video games developed in the United States
Video games set in Russia